Cradle Song is an album by cellist Julian Lloyd Webber. In the U.S., the album was released under the title Lullaby.

Track listing
 Song for Baba by Julian Lloyd Webber Filmed Performance
 Träumerei by Robert Schumann
 Wiegenlied by Franz Schubert
 Cancion de cuna para dormir a un negrito by Xavier Montsalvatge
 Shepherd's Lullaby by Thomas J. Hewitt
 Lullaby by Antonín Dvořák
 Songs My Mother Taught Me by Antonín Dvořák
 Dream Sequence arranged by Richard Rodney Bennett
 Slumber Song by Roger Quilter
 Where Go the Boats by Roger Quilter
 Slumber Song by Cyril Scott
 Slumber Song by William Lloyd Webber
 Brezairola by Joseph Canteloube
 A Little Song by Aram Khachaturian
 Alice by John Lenehan
 Babar the Elephant (excerpt) by Francis Poulenc
 Gentle Dreams by Dave Heath
 Mary's Lullaby by John Rutter
 Berceuse by Gabriel Fauré
 Wiegenlied by Johannes Brahms
 Nursery Suite arranged by Pam Chowhan

Personnel
 Julian Lloyd Webber, Cello
 John Lenehan, Piano
 Pam Chowhan, Piano (Symphony of Pain 2002–present)
 Richard Rodney Bennett, Piano

Philips CD/MC 442 426-2/4

External links 
 Album reviews
 Philips promo video for the CD Cradle Song by Julian Lloyd Webber

1993 albums
Julian Lloyd Webber albums